The 1979 Currie Cup was the 41st edition of the Currie Cup, the premier annual domestic rugby union competition in South Africa.

Results

Semi-finals

Final

See also

 Currie Cup

References

1979
1979 in South African rugby union
1979 rugby union tournaments for clubs